Ecsenius oculatus, the ocular coralblenny, is a species of combtooth blenny in the genus Ecsenius. It is found in coral reefs in the western Indian ocean. It can reach a maximum length of 4.7 centimetres. Blennies in this species feed primarily off of plants, including benthic algae and weeds.

References
 Springer, V. G. 1988 (14 Sept.) The Indo-Pacific blenniid fish genus Ecsenius. Smithsonian Contributions to Zoology No. 465.

oculatus
Fish described in 1988
Taxa named by Victor G. Springer